Jacob Kofi Ayeebo (1960–2019) was an Anglican bishop in Ghana. He was the Bishop of Tamale and died in 2019.

References

1960 births
2019 deaths
Anglican bishops of Tamale
21st-century Anglican bishops in Ghana